Carl Herold (July 20, 1848 – January 13, 1931) was a German politician of the German Centre Party.

Personal life 

Herold was born in Loevelingloh (now part of Münster), Westphalia, the son of Ferdinand Herol, the first professor of pharmaceutical botany at the University of Münster, Germany.  Herold later gained ownership of the estate by marrying Lövingloh in the district of Münster.  After graduating from high school in Münster, Herold studied at the University of Halle-Wittenberg in 1867/68, completing a degree in agricultural training.  In 1870, he took over his father's estate, Loevelingloh.  He died in Münster.

Political career 
Herold was a member of the Centre Party and was chairman of the Westphalia branch of the party. His primary duty was the representation of rural interests.  He did not participate in the general election in 1924 set up by the peasants of the Münsterland, which drew criticism from his constituency. He did participate in one representing predominantly industrial areas in a constituency in south Westphalia.

Herold was a member of the Münster district council for several decades, and was also the local Kreisausschuss. He was also a member of the provincial parliament of Westphalia. From 1898 to 1918 he belonged to the Prussian House of Representatives, where he was Vice Group Chairman of the Centre Party. From 1919 until his death he was member of parliament in Prussia, where he held the position of chairman.

From 1898 to 1918 he held a position in the Reichstag. In 1903, he represented the constituencies of Fulda - Gersfeld - Schlüchtern and Tecklenburg - Steinfurt - Ahaus. In 1919/20 he was a member of the Weimar National Assembly. He served until his death as a member of parliament. He opened the fifth legislative period of the Reichstag in 1930 as an interim president.

Agricultural chairships 
Herold was named to a number of committees, associations, and groups influencing agricultural policy in Germany.  These include:

 Director, Agricultural Central Association for the administrative district of Münster.
 Member, Board of Agriculture of Westfalen Westphalian Peasant Association.
 Member, German government for rural welfare.
 Chairman, Board of Examiners for Agricultural Machinery and Equipment in Westphalia.
 Director, Dairy Association of Westfalen and Lippe.
 Board Member, Rural Central Treasury and the Association of Rural Cooperatives.
 Successor, Burghard Schorlemer-Alst representing the interests of Westphalia agriculture.
 Affiliation, social wing of the Catholic milieu, belonged to the People's Association for Catholic Germany.

References 
 Wilhelm Schulte: "Die (Familie) Herold". In: Westfälische Köpfe. Münster, 1963. S. 111ff.

1848 births
1931 deaths
People from Münster
People from the Province of Westphalia
German Roman Catholics
Centre Party (Germany) politicians
Members of the 10th Reichstag of the German Empire
Members of the 11th Reichstag of the German Empire
Members of the 12th Reichstag of the German Empire
Members of the 13th Reichstag of the German Empire
Members of the Weimar National Assembly
Members of the Reichstag of the Weimar Republic
Members of the Prussian House of Representatives